Suriname competed at the 2019 Pan American Games in Lima, Peru from July 26 to August 11, 2019.

The Suriname team consisted of six athletes (five men and one woman) competing in four sports. Triple jumper Miguel Van Assen had to withdraw from the team due to injury. During the opening ceremony of the games, badminton player Dylan Darmohoetomo carried the flag of the country as part of the parade of nations.

Competitors
The following is the list of number of competitors (per gender) participating at the games per sport/discipline.

Badminton
 
Suriname qualified a team of two male badminton athletes. Originally Suriname also qualified two women, but declined the quotas.

Men

Cycling

Suriname qualified one male track cyclist.

Track
Men
Keirin

Sprint

Swimming

Suriname qualified one male swimmer and received a universality spot to enter one female.

Tjon-A-Joe did not compete in the swim-off in the 100 m freestyle event, thus he did not qualify for the either final.

Taekwondo

Suriname qualified one male taekwondo practitioner.

Kyorugi
Men

See also
Suriname at the 2020 Summer Olympics

References

Nations at the 2019 Pan American Games
2019
2019 in Surinamese sport